FS Class 400 were steam locomotives of French construction, built for service in Italy.  They were 0-8-0 tender locomotives with two outside cylinders.

History

During the second half of 1860 the progress of the construction of the Porrettana railway highlighted the need to order locomotives suitable for the demanding Apennine route, so a construction order was issued for a group of 10 units to the prestigious Koechlin locomotive factory in Mulhouse. For a mountain route, the locomotives had a 0-8-0 wheel arrangement for maximum adhesion. This was the first use of eight-coupled locomotives on Italian railways. The locomotives were delivered between 1861 and 1866 and entered service on the Porrettana railway. A second batch of 10 was ordered in 1871.

Ownership
 LVCI
 Società anonima delle strade ferrate della Lombardia e dell'Italia Centrale
 Società per le strade ferrate dell'Alta Italia (SFAI)
 Rete Mediterranea (RM)
 Italian State Railways (FS)

Numbering
Deliveries took place gradually, beginning in 1861. Owing to company changes, the early numbering is complex but, under the Società per le strade ferrate dell'Alta Italia (SFAI), they became 1281-1290. To cope with an increase in traffic, the company ordered a further batch of 10 locomotives, very similar but more powerful, from the Koechlin factory in 1871. These were assigned to the Frejus line and numbered 1291-1300. Later re-numberings and names  are shown in the table below. Several locomotives were scrapped following accident damage but 14 units survived and passed to the Italian State Railways (FS) in 1905. The locomotives were of sturdy construction, characteristic of those designed by Edouard Beugniot, but were very rudimentary. After a few years' service with the FS they were relegated to banking heavy trains on the old Giovi line. They were withdrawn from service in 1909 and had been scrapped by 1910.

Features
The locomotives had a 0-8-0 wheel arrangement. They were not mass-produced and there were some detail differences between units. There was a wide firebox located behind the driving wheels and, to keep the axle load down to 12.5 tonnes, a part of the weight was carried by the tender. The boiler supplied saturated steam at a maximum pressure of 8 bar and the engine had two outside cylinders. The continuous power output of the first series of machines was 590 hp. The locomotives were not equipped with pneumatic brakes but only a steam brake on the engine and a handbrake on the tender. The footplate was cramped and covered by a simple canopy. It was modified under RM ownership by closing it in to offer a better shelter for the crew. The tenders varied, some having two axles and others having three axles. In later years, the tenders were modified so that they no longer carried part of the locomotive weight.  As was usual at that time, the locomotives were baptized and each received its own name. Seven units were involved in serious accidents and six were written off. The seventh was inherited by the FS in a wrecked condition.

First series

An obvious feature of the 10 locomotives of the first series was the three-axle tender, on which part of the locomotive weight was carried. The continuous power output was 590 hp (434 kW). The sandbox was placed adjacent to the steam dome and the supply pipe delivered sand ahead of the second axle. The safety valve was located on a small dome on top of the firebox.

Second series

The second series of 10 machines was modified by adopting a two-axle tender. The length of the firebox was increased to make it more capacious and the continuous power output rose to 610 hp (448 kW). The sandbox was moved near to the centre of the boiler and delivered sand ahead of the third axle. The safety valve was located on the steam dome, just behind the chimney.

Allocations
 Florence locomotive depot
 Genova Rivarolo locomotive depot

References

Further reading
 
 
 
 

0-8-0 locomotives
400
Railway locomotives introduced in 1861
Standard gauge locomotives of Italy
Rete Mediterranea steam locomotives
Freight locomotives